Narsinghgarh is a town of historical importance in Damoh District, Madhya Pradesh, India. It has an ancient fort built by the Gondwana Kingdom, and the town is situated by Sunar River. Birla group established a cement factory in it, which the German company HeidelbergCement took over, and now it produces cement by the name of Mycem Cement. There are many more historical places in Narsinghgarh, such as the Jankiraman temple, dedicated to Ram and Mata Sita, and an old temple of Siddha Ganesha Mandir. The main part of the ancient fort, which is built by the Godwana Kingdom, is situated beside the Ganesha temple. In Ram Bagh Temple, Lord Hanuman is worshiped. There are many stories about this temple, but the most popular belief is that the statue of Hanuman was taken out from the well situated near the temple, by a cowboy after Lord Hanuman told him in a dream. On every Makara Sankranti, the fair (mela) is organized by the near by locals. Another place, which the locals call Tullu Jhiriya, is famous for continuous flowing water from the rocks.

Twelve kilometers away from Narsingarh is a place called the "Madkole". This place is famous for the Madhkoleshwar Mahadev Mandir, which is the ancient temple of Shiva. The two rivers, Sunar and Copra, can be seen in a place called the Sangam. This is the other place where the yearly Makar Sankranti fair is organized by the locals.Kalakand of sitanagar village is famous delicacy in the area

Geography

See also
 Narsinghgarh State

References

External links
 The Princely State of Narsinghgarh

Cities and towns in Damoh district
1681 establishments in Asia